The 2015 Maryland Terrapins men's soccer team was the college's 70th season of playing organized men's college soccer. It was the Terrapins' second season playing in the Big Ten Conference.

Background 
The 2014 regular season was Maryland's first in the Big Ten. They won both the regular season and the 2014 Big Ten Tournament. Maryland lost in the second round of the NCAA Tournament to UMBC.

Roster

Schedule 

|-
|-
!colspan=6 style="background:#CE1126; color:#FFFFFF;"| Preseason
|-

|-

|-

|-
!colspan=6 style="background:#CE1126; color:#FFFFFF;"| Regular season
|-

|-

|-
!colspan=6 style="background:#CE1126; color:#FFFFFF;"| Big Ten Tournament
|-

|-
!colspan=6 style="background:#CE1126; color:#FFFFFF;"| NCAA Tournament
|-

Statistics

Transfers

See also 
2015 Big Ten Conference men's soccer season
2015 Big Ten Conference Men's Soccer Tournament
2015 NCAA Division I Men's Soccer Championship

References 

Maryland Terrapins
Maryland Terrapins men's soccer seasons
Maryland Terrapins, Soccer
Maryland Terrapins
Maryland Terrapins
Big Ten Conference men's soccer champion seasons